Godwin Osei Bonsu (born 3 March 1989) is a Ghanaian football defender who plays for Gaborone United S.C.

Club career
He started in Hearts of Oak SC from his home town Accra. He played for Hearts of Oak SC from 2008 to 2013 with a short time spent in Hapoel Ra'anana where he played 2 cup matches. In summer 2009, after winning silver with Ghana at the African Nations Championship, Hearts of Oak reached an agreement with AEK Paphos to loan him to the Cypriot team in a one-year loan, however Bonsu soon returned without making a league debut.  After returning to Hearts of Oak, Bonsu became part of the 2011–12 Ghanaian Premier League team of the season.

In summer 2013 he moved in Serbia, in Radnik Surdulica. After season and 20 games for club, he moved to Radnički Kragujevac next summer. He played his first official match for Radnički Kragujevac in Serbian Cup against Jagodina on 29 October, and he made his Jelen SuperLiga debut against OFK Beograd on 2 November 2014.

International career
He played with Ghana in the 2009 African Nations Championship Final.

Honours

Club
Hearts of Oak
 Ghana Premier League: 2008–09

National team
Ghana national team
 African Nations Championship: 2009 (second place)

Personal
 Ghana Premier League: 2011–12 team of the season

References

External links
 

1989 births
Living people
Footballers from Accra
Association football defenders
Ghanaian footballers
Ghana international footballers
Accra Hearts of Oak S.C. players
Ghana Premier League players
Ghanaian expatriate footballers
Ghanaian expatriate sportspeople in Israel
Expatriate footballers in Israel
Hapoel Ra'anana A.F.C. players
Expatriate footballers in Cyprus
AEP Paphos FC players
Ghanaian expatriate sportspeople in Serbia
Expatriate footballers in Serbia
FK Radnik Surdulica players
FK Radnički 1923 players
Serbian First League players
Serbian SuperLiga players
Liga Leumit players
Gaborone United S.C. players
Expatriate footballers in Botswana
Ghana A' international footballers